Blessing Football Club is a Congolese football club based in Kolwezi, Lualaba province and currently playing in the Linafoot Ligue 1, the second level of the Congolese football.

References

Football clubs in the Democratic Republic of the Congo
Football clubs in Lubumbashi